Kawcze may refer to the following places in Poland:
Kawcze, Pomeranian Voivodeship (north Poland)
Kawcze, Greater Poland Voivodeship (west-central Poland)
Kawcze, Śrem County in Greater Poland Voivodeship (west-central Poland)